An annular solar eclipse occurred on July 20, 1925. A solar eclipse occurs when the Moon passes between Earth and the Sun, thereby totally or partly obscuring the image of the Sun for a viewer on Earth. An annular solar eclipse occurs when the Moon's apparent diameter is smaller than the Sun's, blocking most of the Sun's light and causing the Sun to look like an annulus (ring). An annular eclipse appears as a partial eclipse over a region of the Earth thousands of kilometres wide. Annularity was visible from northern part of Northland Region and the whole Kermadec Islands in New Zealand on July 21st (Tuesday), and Rapa Iti in French Polynesia on July 20th (Monday).

Related eclipses

Solar eclipses 1924–1928

Saros 125

Inex series

Tritos series

Metonic series

Notes

References 

1925 7 20
1925 7 20
1925 in science
July 1925 events